Joha is a variety of rice grown in India, notable for its aroma, delicate and excellent taste. Assam is the largest cultivator of this rice, it is primarily grown through paddy field farming.

Varieties 

There are various traditional types of joha rice available in Assam. Tulsi (তুলসী )Joha, Kola (ক’লা ) Joha, Rampal (ৰামপাল ) joha,  Kunkuni (কুনকুনি )and Manki Joha.

See also 

 List of rice varieties

References

External links 

Bengali cuisine
Rice varieties
Economy of Assam
Rice production in India
Flora of Assam (region)